Bruneria yukonensis, the Yukon slant-faced grasshopper, is a species of slant-faced grasshopper in the family Acrididae. It is endemic to Yukon, Canada.

References

Further reading

 

Gomphocerinae
Endemic fauna of Yukon
Articles created by Qbugbot
Insects described in 1969